Jazmín María Elizondo Villalobos (born 16 December 1994) is a Costa Rican footballer who plays as a forward for Herediano and the Costa Rica women's national team.

Career
Elizondo made her international debut for Costa Rica on 28 January 2020 in the 2020 CONCACAF Women's Olympic Qualifying Championship against Panama. She came on as a substitute in the 74th minute for Melissa Herrera and scored the final goal of the match, which finished as a 6–1 win.

International goals

References

External links
 

1994 births
Living people
Costa Rican women's footballers
Costa Rica women's international footballers
Women's association football forwards